Jan Linton is a British singer, musician and producer from Warrington who helped internationalise the music scene in Tokyo, Japan.

Biography 
Jan Linton studied violin from the age of four, moving briefly onto piano, before discovering pop music and electric guitar as a teenager. When he was 17 years old, his first synthesizer exploded, leading him to try bass guitar instead.

After graduating from Birmingham University, he left for Japan in January 1990 after encouragement from P-Model's Tatsuya Kikuchi then subsequently Susumu Hirasawa, and secured a recording agreement from King Records after just three days. The project combined electronics with Asian pop and a world music flavour, including a performance by violinist and Chinese Kokyū player Masatsugu Shinozaki (who performed on the soundtrack to The Last Emperor). A change in A&R management delayed Linton's first CD, Oinaru Sekai (TrueNirvana); it was finally released at the end of 1992 from Polystar Records. The producer also worked with the Japanese boy band SMAP, with the result that the album swung between electro-pop and Asian World Music. The album was sung in ten languages, including Japanese, with a cover version of "Kimi ni Mune Kyun" by YMO.

In 1993, Roger Eno introduced Linton to renowned guitarist and artist Bill Nelson, of whom Linton had been a fan since his university days. Nelson contributed guitar to some new tracks Linton was recording. One was released by Sony in 1994 on Juliana's Tokyo's "Global Dance Network" (Sony Records SRCS7425) which sold 15,000 copies. This established Linton as one of the few non-Japanese musicians in the Japanese scene of the time, which centred on Juliana's Tokyo, modelled superficially on British style "raves". However, Linton's track "6 Ritual" was clearly going in a different direction.

From 1994 to 1997 his releases were sporadic, as the Japanese scene had moved into instrumental techno and Linton was mainly a singer at the time. Only one track, the jungle (music) styled "Jungle Friends" was released on 12 inch vinyl from Ummo Records.

In 1998, his instrumental piece "Sarajevo" was chosen to open a Princess Diana tribute/charity album sponsored by the British Embassy, and it sold five thousand copies, even though the CD had no label or distribution at all. In 1999 he was able to release an EP of earlier tracks, and Sony Asia Pacific later marketed it. Linton formed a band called Dr.Jan (guru) which played frequently at large venues. Under the band's name, he released three albums over the next few years: starting with Alienshamanism in 2000  However, the live members often changed and rarely appeared on the albums; instead, a number of well-known musicians contributed to the recording sessions, such as Duran Duran's John Taylor. The albums also included reworkings of the unreleased tracks Linton had recorded with Bill Nelson.

Linton made several releases in 2000 in the UK, Japan, and Europe. The singles "Inner Sanctum" ("Can't You Feel") and "Sarajevo" were both number one hits on the MP3 electronic music charts in several countries. Linton also released the first of a series of experimental albums under his own name, on the "Kaerucafe" label, which is noted for experimental and sampling CDs. Inspired by the notoriously difficult to program Yamaha DX7 synthesizer as used by Brian Eno, Music for Aliens was the best selling sampling CD in national stores such as Yamaha. In 2001 a collaborative project with the former Japan and Porcupine Tree synthesist, Richard Barbieri, was again marketed as a sampling CD and titled Cosmic Prophets. This became a cult classic, and is still available on the UK Burning Shed label.

In 2003, Linton signed a European distribution contract for a compilation of new, unreleased, and re-recorded tracks. The album Communion included a cover of "Dark Entries" by Bauhaus; of John Taylor's "King Porn" (which the band had been playing since two concerts in International Stadium Yokohama in 2001); and a track of Linton's, "Lose Yourself With Me", which Taylor also played bass on. The album was released as by Jan Linton/Dr.Jan (guru).

In 2004, King Records signed Linton to make another album as Dr.Jan (guru) again. Entitled Planet Japan, it was in a rock/cyberpunk style (such as a cover version of the John Foxx-period Ultravox! song "Hiroshima Mon Amour"), and the controversial subject matter — Linton's occasionally bitter experiences in Tokyo — caused a slight stir in the Japanese media. Featuring the former Japan and Ippu-Do guitarist Masami Tsuchiya, Hoppy Kamiyama, and sounds from Richard Barbieri, (one instrumental, "Sequential Sakura" was credited as a Barbieri/Linton joint composition), it was released by King after being recorded in just seven weeks, an experience which exhausted Linton.

A UK promotional video (and later, CD/DVD single) of a drum n bass reworking of Bauhaus's "Dark Entries" (from the Communion album) followed, but due to label disputes was never fully released. This marks the last use of the name Dr.Jan (guru) to date.

He moved back to the UK in 2005 to study for a Master of Arts degree in music technology at Bath Spa University while supplying sounds for Roland's new sampler and demonstrating Roland and Digital Stage's Motion Dive Tokyo Console VJ software throughout 2006. A chance meeting in Bath with Leo Abrahams led to collaboration on "Anemone" and "The Kindness of Strangers", but other than the former, all of Linton's academic output from this period remains unreleased. In 2007, he translated the lyrics for various songs by Susumu Hirasawa into English, more than a decade since the two had last been in contact.

In early 2011, Entropy Records released Linton's 2009–2010 reworkings of the sounds of FM3's Buddha Machine versions 1 and 2, but following the 9.0 magnitude Tōhoku earthquake and tsunami and subsequent releases of radioactive materials in Japan (where Linton had returned in 2007) delayed the release until late March.

In 2012, he released a benefit CD for Sendai earthquake reconstruction with contributions from Matthew Seligman. In 2015–2017, he recorded two separate releases of an album entitled I Actually Come Back, collaborating in part once more with Seligman and Leo Abrahams.
In 2020, following Matthew Seligman's death, the Sendai EP was re-released in an expanded form, followed by a second EP of previously recorded material.

Discography

Albums 
  (1993) Polystar HI-1023
  (2000) Kaerucafe 0104
 Alienshamanism (2000) [] Nap/25 FO26
  (2003) [] Kaerucafe 28186842354
  (2003) [/] Explosion RT0005
  (2004) King Records KICP1014
  mini-album (2011) Entropy Records EM 007
  mini album (2015) [ with ] Burning Shed
  Full album with bonus mini album "Buddha Machine Music" (2016–17) [ with ] Entropy Records/jansongs

EPs 
  EP (1999) Global Vision Music GVM0010
  EP (2012) [ with ] Entropy Records ED 006
  Extended Reissue EP (2020) [ with ] jansongs/MRC
  EP (2020) [ with ] jansongs/MRC

Singles 
  (2000) Groove 052

Collaboration albums 
 Global Dance Music Vol.2 "6 Ritual" Dr.Jan (& Scorpio Family) Sony Records SRCS7425 (1994)
  track "King Porn" Dr.Jan (guru) mix 2-CD (2001) [] TTP TTP1201A
  sampling sound collection (2001) [ & ] Kaerucafe 0130
  step,uk garage and r'n'b'construction kit (2002) [Frame Shift] Kaerucafe 0143

Collaboration singles 
  (2007) [ with ] Just Music/Bip Hop

Compilation albums 
  download compilation (2015?) Burning Shed

References

External links 
dr jan guru on Myspace
Jan Linton on Myspace

Year of birth missing (living people)
Living people
Alumni of the University of Birmingham
British electronic musicians
Ambient musicians